Prayagraj refers to Allahabad.

Prayagraj may also refer to:
 Prayagraj district, district of Uttar Pradesh
 Prayagraj division, administrative unit of Uttar Pradesh
 Prayagraj Junction railway station, railway station in the city.
 Prayag Junction railway station, satellite station in the city.
 Prayagraj Chheoki railway station, railway station in the city